HB was a Christian symphonic metal band, formed in Forssa, Finland in 2002. They recorded a demo, four albums in Finnish with English versions for three of them, three singles, and a live DVD filmed at the Maata Näkyvissä Festival (2006).

Concerning the origin and meaning of the initials HB, Johanna Kultalahti (Aaltonen) said at the official website of the band: "Actually the initials H and B don't really stand for anything. We once had a competition on our webpage, where people could suggest different meanings for the two letters. Holy Bible was one of the suggestions."

Musically the band performs symphonic metal with powerful sounds of the electric guitars, bass guitar and drums, fused with characteristic instruments of classical music, choir and even a few verses of lyric singing. The band is also characterized by the strong spiritual content in their Christ-centred lyrics.

Johanna Kultalahti (Aaltonen), the original lead vocalist, left in early 2013, to be replaced by Miia Rautkoski, who in turn announced her departure from the band in March 2014. On May 3, 2014 the band announced Johanna Aaltonen was back with HB.

On December 10, 2016 they played their farewell concert in Germany at Christmas Rock Night. They told the audience that they had decided to go their own ways in mutual agreement.

in March 2022 they released a new music video, "Praying for Europe".

Members

Final line-up
Johanna Kultalahti (Aaltonen) – vocals (2002–2013, 2014–2016)
Antti Niskala – guitar (2002–2016)
Markus Malin – drums (2007–2009, 2011–2016)
Tuomas Kannisto – bass (2009–2016)

Other former members
Keijo Kauppinen – guitar (2006–2007)
Tuomas Mäki-Kerttula – bass (2002–2008)
Tommi Huuskonen – bass (2008–2009)
Janne Karhunen – guitar (2006–2009)
Samuel Mäki-Kerttula – drums (2002–2007, 2009–2011)
Bob Kanervo – guitar (2009–2011)
Sofia Ylinen – guitar (2009–2011)
Miia Rautkoski– vocals (2013–2014)

Timeline

Discography

References

External links
 

Finnish Christian metal musical groups
Musical quintets
Musical groups established in 2002
2002 establishments in Finland